The Stewart Copeland Anthology is a compilation album by Stewart Copeland, released in 2007. It is the third anthological album about the solo work of a member of The Police after Sting's Fields of Gold: The Best of Sting 1984–1994 (1994) and Andy Summers' The X Tracks (2004).

Contents 
The Stewart Copeland Anthology is a fairly comprehensive overview of Copeland's solo work. It features mostly film music as well as three singles Copeland has released over the course of his career ("Too Kool to Kalypso" from his studio albums Klark Kent: Music Madness from the Kinetic Kid; "Don't Box Me In" from Rumble Fish; and "Koteya" from The Rythmathist). A live version of "The Equalizer", originally released as a single form the album The Equalizer & Other Cliff Hangers is also included. The album features two previously unreleased songs, "Look Up" (with vocals by Martina Topley-Bird) and "Slither".

Track listing

Personnel
 Stewart Copeland – vocals, drums, guitar, bass, keyboards, percussions
 Stan Ridgway - vocals and harmonica on "Don't Box Me In"
 Ray Lema – vocals on "Koteja"
 Michael Andreas – piano on "Slither"
 Michael Thompson – guitar on "Night Drive"
 Judd Miller – woodwinds on "Taxi Drive Home"/"Bill is Dead" and "George Trip"/"End Montage"
 Les Claypool - bass and vocals on "Wield the Spades"
 Trey Anastasio - guitar on "Wield the Spades"
 Martina Topley-Bird - vocals on "Look Up"
 Stanley Clarke - bass on "Childhood Friends"
 Charlie Bisharat - violin on "George Trip"/"End Montage"
 Vittorio Cosma - keyboards on "Pizzica degli Ucci" and "Big Drum Tribe"
 Mauro Refosco - percussions on "Big Drum Tribe"
 David Fiuczynski - guitar on "Big Drum Tribe"
 Armand Sabal-Lecco - bass on "Big Drum Tribe"
 The Orchestra Ueca on "Equalizer"
 Notte della Taranta Ensemble on "Pizzica degli Ucci"
 Recorded, mixed, and engineered by Jeff Seitz
 Mastering engineer: Howie Weinberg
 Album art and design: Eugenio Brambilla

References

2007 compilation albums
Stewart Copeland albums